The British Armed Forces operates a wide range of communications and information systems.  Some of these are specialised military systems, while others are procured off-the-shelf.  They fall into three main categories:  satellite ground terminals, terrestrial trunk communications systems, and combat net radio systems. Every part of the Army and the uses combat net radio, but only the Royal Corps of Signals and the Royal Air Force operates trunk systems and multi-channel satellite communications.

Satellite ground terminals
Satellite ground terminals play an important part in modern military communications, in view of their high bandwidth and their independence of local communications infrastructure.

In-service systems

TSC 503

The TSC 503 is a transportable compact multi-role satellite bridging system manufactured by SELEX Communications.  It can be deployed in two forms: the first is a rapid deployable terminal with 2MB/s capability that can be on-air in 30 minutes with a two-man crew. The larger full capability terminal, with a 4M antenna, has much increased capacity and a time-into-action of two hours with a four-man crew. Users can be located up to 4 km from the antenna and is one of the most prominent satellite. The terminals are composed of a number of man portable containers. TSC 503, which entered service in mid 1990s, is now no longer in service.

TALON

Talon is a lightweight deployable terminal which uses off-the-shelf commercial technology packaged to provide a terminal suitable for military use.  The terminal is controlled from a ruggedised laptop and can be set up by a crew of two trained operators within 30 minutes. Talon has been employed by the ARRC (Allied Rapid Reaction Corps) in Germany and was used extensively in Operation TELIC in Iraq.  Talon terminals were brought into service in July 2002 and were incorporated into the Skynet 5 contract in October 2003. Each terminal can be carried in a single vehicle, towing the generator mounted on a trailer.

REACHER

Reacher comprises the mobile satellite ground terminals that give military ground forces communications access through Skynet 5 satellites. There are two variants in service with the British Army, Royal Air Force and Royal Marines.  Reacher Medium is a ruggedised land terminal with a 2.4m antenna designed for X-Band military satellite communications. It is designed to operate with a deployed advanced headquarters, and is carried on a Bucher Duro 6x6 vehicle with a detachable cabin and towing a trailer. Reacher Large is mounted on the same vehicle as Reacher Medium, but has a 4.8 m antenna. Reacher All Terrain is in service with the Royal Marines and is mounted on two BV206 vehicles with associated trailers.  All Reacher terminals are transportable using Chinook helicopters, C130 aircraft, by sea and by rail. The systems are supplied by EADS Astrium subsidiary company Paradigm Secure Communications.

No longer in service

VSC 501

The VSC 501 was a vehicle-mounted tactical military satellite terminal, initially operated by 249 Signal Squadron (AMF(L)) (disbanded) and then by 30th Signal Regiment, the Royal Air Force Tactical Communications Wing (now 90 SU), and the Royal Marines. It operated in the military SHF SATCOM frequency band of 7.25 to 8.4 GHz via a geosynchronous satellite, with a data rate of up to 512 kbit/s.  The normal manning level for an VSC 501 station was a crew of two and the system could be set up to provide communications within 15 minutes.  The VSC 501 was the workhorse of the UK tactical military SATCOM system for some years. It was carried in both Land Rovers (Army) and BV 206 All Terrain Vehicles (Royal Marines). An update and enhancement package was completed in late 1999, which included a self-tracking antenna to replace the previous hand-adjusted variant, extended the life of the terminal for several years.  Deployments include the Gulf during Operation GRANBY and Bosnia. The VSC 501 was made by Marconi, based on the Racal TSC 501 satellite equipment.

TSC 502

The Racal TSC 502 was a transportable satellite ground terminal.  It was used by 30th Signal Regiment on Operation CORPORATE in the Falklands War.  It was replaced by the TSC 503 in the mid 1990s.

DAGGER

Dagger is a Land Rover-mounted modular military and civil band satellite communications system designed for rapid deployment and installed in a hard top Land Rover 110 TD5.  It was supplied by SELEX Communications, and saw service in the Balkans, Afghanistan and on Operation TELIC.

PSC 504

PSC 504 was an X-band military satellite communications system designed to provide Special Forces with a highly secure, reliable, flexible and rapidly deployable manpack SATCOM system. Manpack patrol terminals fit in the top of a standard Bergen rucksack. The terminals could be assembled and connected to the satellite network within five minutes by one soldier, even in darkness, to provide long-range secure voice, data and messaging services, as well as a store and forward (e-mail-type) facility. Data services operated at up to 64 kbit/s.

PSC 506
PSC 506 terminals operated as an autonomous network that employed Demand Assigned Multiple Access technology and provided secure speech and secure data. Key elements were Fixed Communications Bases, portable Headquarters Terminals and Patrol Terminals. The system was used from the late 1980s to 2012. The system was developed by Thales from a trials model developed by the Signals Research and Development Establishment, later Royal Signals and Radar Establishment, in the late 1970s.

Terrestrial trunk radio relay
Terrestrial trunk radio relay systems are primarily used to connect the headquarters of brigades, divisions and higher military formations.  They typically deliver voice and data services, and can be based on boxed or palletized equipment, or vehicle installations (which may be mounted under armour for use on the battlefield).

In-service systems

Ptarmigan (obsolete) 
 

Ptarmigan is a mobile, cryptographic digital and modular battlefield wide area network communications system based on the Plessey System 250 architecture.  It was initially designed to meet the needs of the British Army of the Rhine in West Germany, and replaced the BRUIN system. The system consists of a network of electronic exchanges known as trunk nodes.  These nodes are connected by multichannel UHF and SHF radio relay links that carry voice, data, telegraph and facsimile communications.  The Single Channel Radio Access subsystem is effectively a VHF secure mobile telephone system that gives isolated or mobile users an entry point into the network.

First delivery of Ptarmigan equipment was to 1 Armoured Division HQ and Signal Regiment in December 1984, and it entered service in February/March 1985. Subsequent upgrades include the introduction of an Air Portable Secondary Access Node for 16 Air Assault Brigade, and the General Purpose Trunk Access Port software enhancement which provides interconnectivity to other nations' tactical communications systems.

Ptarmigan's system design was the result of detailed studies and feasibility trials carried out jointly by the UK MoD, the Royal Corps of Signals and Royal Signals and Radar Establishment (RSRE), the British Army Royal School of Signals and industry. The Plessey Company (subsequently Siemens Plessey Systems and then a constituent part of BAE Systems) was appointed prime contractor and system design authority for Ptarmigan in 1973, with responsibility for engineering development of the complete system; the initial development programme was followed by a series of production contracts worth some £500 million. They covered the provision of the full range of Ptarmigan items from small individual equipments, such as subsets, to major vehicle-mounted installations such as switches and SCRA radio centrals.

A major phased enhancement programme to provide high-integrity packet switched data, including mobile X.25 packet access, international interfacing and the development of equipment for use in armoured vehicles commenced in 1984 and was completed in 1992. BAE Systems was the appointed design authority for supporting the system throughout its post-design phase. This covers the full range of support services from components and equipment up to network level. During the 1991 Operation Granby, Ptarmigan was deployed extensively throughout the operational area with extended satellite trunk links, and was heavily used by British and Allied forces. The system gained further in-service use when deployed in support of the International Peace Implementation Force (IFOR) in Bosnia. Total investment in Ptarmigan by mid-1992 was approaching £1 billion. In August 1993, a £22 million contract was awarded to modify the system to allow deployment over long distances with satellite links.

Cormorant

Cormorant is the area trunk communications network that links the component headquarters of the British Joint Rapid Reaction Force. The system is manufactured by the European EADS company. Cormorant has two basic elements:
The local access component, based on an ATM switch, provides local digital voice subscriber facilities and a high speed data local area network for over twenty headquarters.
The wide area component allows the interconnection of these headquarters across a large geographical area, as well as the means to interconnect with single service and multinational systems. The system is containerised and can be operated in either vehicle mounted or dismounted mode. The underlying technology is based on open standards such as ATM and TCP/IP.
A Cormorant network can consist of the following installations:
Local area support module
Core element
Bearer module
Long-range bearer module (tropospheric scatter)
Management information systems
Interoperable gateways
Tactical fibre-optic cabling
Short range radio

FALCON

FALCON has replaced Ptarmigan with a new generation tactical trunk communications system, manufactured by BAE Systems Military Air and Information. It will deliver secure voice and data over an all Internet Protocol system across multiple security domains. The system is fielded by the Royal Signals and the Royal Air Force.

The key platforms will be the Wide Area Service Provision (WASP) nodes with up to six radio links and a series of Command Post Support (CPS) nodes which will be scaled for headquarters of differing sizes, further supported by transportable (palletised) and early entry nodes. All wheeled platforms will utilise the British Army's standard MAN HX 60 Cargo Vehicle (Light) platform.

No longer in service

BRUIN (obsolete)

Introduced in 1967, BRUIN was the Army's first area trunk network mounted in both wheeled and tracked vehicles, which connected formation headquarters and units using multi-channel UHF radios. BRUIN provided a partially secure and automatic system for the transmission of both voice and teleprinter traffic.  It was the primary trunk communications system of the British Army of the Rhine from 1967 to 1982.  During the years of the Cold War Royal Signals units in 1st British Corps trained with BRUIN, and deployed their equipment and vehicles among the woods and farms of northern West Germany, putting their skills to the test in an annual cycle of command and signal exercises.

Combat net radio
Combat net radio systems are typically used for tactical communications at section and platoon level upwards.  They are operated by soldiers from every part of the Army as well as the specialists from the Royal Corps of Signals.

In-service systems

Bowman

Bowman is the name of the tactical communications system used by the British Armed Forces. The Bowman C4I system consists of a range of HF radio, VHF radio and UHF radio sets designed to provide secure integrated voice, data services to dismounted soldiers, individual vehicles and command HQs up to Division level.

No longer in service

Larkspur (obsolete)

Larkspur was the combat net radio system used by the British Army in the 1960s and replaced by Clansman in the late 1970s.

Clansman (obsolescent)

Clansman was the combat net radio system used by the British Army from the late 1970s until its replacement by Bowman.

References

Communications and information systems
British military radio
History of telecommunications in the United Kingdom
 
Military equipment of the United Kingdom